Gordon Latto (25 June 1911, in Dundee – 2 September 1998, in Reading) was a Scottish doctor, nutritionist and naturopath, who was President of both the International Vegetarian Union and the Vegetarian Society of U.K.

Life and Work 
Gordon Latto was educated at the High School of Dundee, and qualified in Medicine in 1935 from the University of St Andrews. After the marriage to the German Barbara Krebs (1911 – 2000) in 1938 they toured Germany, where they learned about the Kneipp Hydrotherapy at Munich and visited several other Nature Cure Clinics. His wife Barbara had also a lively correspondence with Dr. Bircher-Benner, convinced rawfood supporter and founder of the famous 'Bircher Clinic' in Zurich. Latto and his wife were both vegetarians. Several well-known persons were among Latto's patients. Francis Chichester, who sailed round the world, was one of them.

From 1969 until 1987 Latto was President of the Vegetarian Society of U.K. Ltd, and he was elected President of the International Vegetarian Society (IVU) from 1971 to 1990. He was also Vizepräsident of the Anti-Vivisection Society.

They had five children. Daughter Rosemary qualified as an osteopath, and three of the four sons also qualified in Medicine.

References

External links
 
 International Vegetarian Union - Dr. Gordon Latto

1911 births
1998 deaths
People educated at the High School of Dundee
Alumni of the University of St Andrews
20th-century Scottish medical doctors
British nutritionists
International Vegetarian Union
Naturopaths
People associated with the Vegetarian Society
Medical doctors from Dundee
Scottish vegetarianism activists